Dave (stylized as DAVE) is an American comedy television series that premiered on FXX on March 4, 2020. It was co-created by rapper/comedian Lil Dicky, who plays the titular character, and Jeff Schaffer. Kevin Hart and Greg Mottola form part of the production team. Lil Dicky's real-life hype man, GaTa, co-stars as himself. On May 11, 2020, the series was renewed for a second season, which premiered on June 16, 2021. On February 17, 2022, FXX renewed the series for a third season which is scheduled to premiere on April 5, 2023.

Premise
The series stars a fictionalized version of Lil Dicky, a suburban neurotic man in his late twenties who has convinced himself that he's destined to be one of the best rappers of all time.

Cast

Main
 Lil Dicky as himself, an aspiring rapper from suburban Philadelphia
 Taylor Misiak as Ally Wernick, a kindergarten teacher, Dave's girlfriend and later ex-girlfriend
 GaTa as himself, Dave's on-stage hype man and a rapper himself, who lives with bipolar disorder
 Andrew Santino as Mike, Dave's roommate and later manager
 Travis "Taco" Bennett of Odd Future as Elliot "Elz", Dave's childhood friend, a sound engineer, producer, and DJ
 Christine Ko as Emma, Ally's roommate and friend, and Dave's graphic designer

Recurring
 Gina Hecht as Carol Burd, Dave's mom
 David Paymer as Don Burd, Dave's dad
 Benny Blanco as himself, Dave's friend and producer

Guest appearances
Dave features many celebrity cameos and guest appearances.

Season 1
YG
Macklemore 
Trippie Redd
Young Thug
Gunna
MadeinTYO
O.T. Genasis
Charlamagne tha God
Tierra Whack
Angela Yee
Ninja
Justin Bieber 
Kourtney Kardashian
Marshmello

Season 2
CL 
Hailey Bieber
Kendall Jenner
Kyle Kuzma
Kareem Abdul-Jabbar
Doja Cat
Rae Sremmurd
J Balvin
Zach King
Lil Yachty
Desiigner
Dave East
Denzel Curry
DJ Drama
Kevin Hart
Lil Nas X

Season 3
Usher
Rick Ross
Demi Lovato
Don Cheadle
Machine Gun Kelly
Megan Fox
Killer Mike
Travis Barker

Episodes

Season 1 (2020)

Season 2 (2021)

Season 3

Reception
Dave has received positive reviews from critics. On Metacritic, the first season has a score of 64 out of 100 based on 10 reviews indicating "generally positive reviews." On Rotten Tomatoes, it has a certified fresh approval rating of 76% with an average score of 6.80 out of 10 based on 21 reviews. The website's critical consensus is, "DAVE can be just as off-putting as Lil Dicky's rap persona with its abundance of genitalia jokes and self-aggrandizement, but beneath the raunchy veneer is a surprisingly self-aware show with a sweet core."

On Metacritic, the second season has a score of 84 out of 100 based on 10 reviews indicating "universal acclaim." On Rotten Tomatoes, the second season received an approval rating of 91% with an average score of 8.30 out of 10 based on 11 reviews. The website's critical consensus is, "Dave still has a lot of growing up to do, but DAVE has matured into a darkly hilarious and disarmingly wise comedy about the alienating price of fame." GaTa's performance as himself has been singled as a standout from the first two seasons.

After mixed reviews for the first few episodes that were previewed by media outlets, the second half of the season was positively received by The Guardian, IndieWire, Financial Times, Rolling Stone, and more. Reviewers noted the expansion of the series' sources of humor, its dedication to character development, and improved emotional depth. At the end of its first season, Dave averaged 5.32 million viewers per episode, making it the most popular comedy in FX's history. It was renewed for a second season in May 2020.

While most of the characters and actors have been praised, the "Lil Dicky" character in the show has been negatively received. Many reviewers have noted that while the character's success is the center of the show, his poor treatment of his friends makes him difficult to root for. Additionally, the first season has been criticized for exploring and idealizing fame over art. Daniel D'Addario of Variety unfavorably compared the show to Atlanta, another entry from FX. D'Addario states "When Donald Glover made an FX show about characters trying to break into the music industry, it was 'Atlanta,' among the most expansive, richly imaginative shows of the century so far. When Lil Dicky does it, it's a show whose breaks from flatly telling us about his character's private parts tend to follow a linear trajectory: Lil Dicky, a ditherer with more zeal for fame than true creative ambition, ends up trying something, it goes viral, everyone loves it."

Accolades

References

External links
  – official site
 
 

English-language television shows
2020s American comedy television series
2020 American television series debuts
FXX original programming
Television series by 20th Century Fox Television
Television series based on singers and musicians